The Detroit Harbor Terminal Building, also known as the Detroit Marine Terminal Building, is an abandoned ten-story warehouse in Detroit, Michigan. The warehouse is located on the Detroit River just downriver from the Ambassador Bridge between S. McKinstry and Clark Streets on West Jefferson Avenue.

On 1 May 1925, the Detroit Railway and Harbor Terminals Company issued $3.75 million in bonds towards the construction of a 12-acre terminal warehouse and related facilities. The large warehouse that would be built was intended to relieve shortage of storage space for the growing city.  Construction of a ten-story, 900,000 square feet building, of reinforced concrete, was the largest on the Great Lakes when it opened on 15 March 1926. The new building was designed by Albert Kahn and his firm.

Current Status 
The former warehouse was acquired by Boblo Island Amusement Co., and used up until 2003 when the site was foreclosed; the Boblo Island Amusement Park had already been long abandoned since 1993. This structure quickly became a hot-spot for explorers, photographers, and vandals; due to the building's immense size, there was plenty of space to partake in these activities.

In 2016, a fire was sparked in the fourth-floor offices of the building, and the blaze was fought throughout the night.

By 2021, the former warehouse was purchased by the Moroun Company, with plans for demolition, In 2022, demolition of the building had begun. However, demolition unexpectedly halted with not much being done, and the building currently sits abandoned as of 2023. It is suspected that the Detroit-Wayne County Port Authority may have been the reason why the Moroun Company hasn't proceeded with demolition, as they have stated their objection to demolish the warehouse.

Gallery

See also
 Boblo Island Amusement Park (1898-1993) on Bois Blanc Island (Ontario), formerly a destination of ferry service from this terminal.

Further reading
 Detroit Harbor Terminals Building at Abandoned
 Detroit Harbor Terminals Building at DetroitUrbex

References 

Unused buildings in Detroit
Historic warehouses in the United States
Buildings and structures in Detroit
Canada–United States border crossings
Industrial buildings completed in 1926
1926 establishments in Michigan
Detroit River
Mill architecture